Diamond Eyes (Thai: ตาสัมผัสผี) is a Thai series produced by Mono broadcast co.,ltd, Boomerang Media Co.,Ltd. and Pakphumjai Co.,Ltd. Screenplay by Kowit Vachasit, KhaoPun, Kitiporn Chimploy, Amnard Thangsomboon and Pornthep Benjasirimongkol. Directed by Pakphum Wongjinda. It stars Shahkrit Yamnam, Kornkamon Charoenchai, Surawoot Maikan, Chayanun Pipatchayakun, Ratchanon Ruenpech, Nattida Treechaiya, Nicha Piyawattananon and other performers.

The series follows Police Captain Petch Phumthai's story. He was attacked and lost his left eye. Luckily, someone donated an eye, but to his surprise it was a special eye which can see ghosts. He uses it to solve police investigations and prove cases. Diamond Eyes will be released in 2017 on MONO29.

Cast and Characters

Main Characters

Supporting Characters

Special Characters

Military ranks of the Thai armed forces

Episodes

References

Thai crime television series
Thai action television series
2010s Thai television series
2018 Thai television series debuts
2018 Thai television series endings
Television shows set in Bangkok
Mono 29 original programming